Harris English (born July 23, 1989) is an American professional golfer and currently a member of the PGA Tour.

Amateur career
Born in Valdosta, Georgia, English attended The Baylor School in Chattanooga, Tennessee, for high school, graduating in 2007. While at Baylor, English won a 2005 Tennessee individual state title, and won four Tennessee team state titles from 2004 to 2007. Committing as a high school junior to the University of Georgia in Athens, English played on the Bulldog golf team  and graduated in 2011 with a business degree.

As an amateur, English played in two Nationwide Tour events 2011: the  Stadion Athens Classic at UGA in May and the Nationwide Children's Hospital Invitational in July, which he won. He was only the third amateur to win on the Tour, following Daniel Summerhays in 2007 and Russell Henley in 2011. The tournament was played at the Ohio State University Golf Club, Scarlet Course in Columbus.

Professional career

Nationwide Tour
After playing in the Walker Cup in 2011 in Scotland, English turned professional in September. His debut was at the Nationwide Tour's Soboba Golf Classic and he nearly won his second event at the WNB Golf Classic, but lost in a playoff to Danny Lee. The runner-up finish moved him to 75th on the Nationwide Tour's money list. In December, English earned his PGA Tour card for 2012 by finishing in a tie for 13th at the PGA Tour Qualifying Tournament.

PGA Tour
As a PGA Tour rookie in 2012, English made 22 of 27 cuts with three top ten finishes, and earned over $1.18 million to keep his tour card. He secured his first victory in 2013, at the FedEx St. Jude Classic in Memphis in June. Later in the year, English won for the second time at the OHL Classic at Mayakoba. A final round 65 taking him to a four stroke win over Brian Stuard.

In February 2015, English held the co-lead at the 54-hole stage of the Farmers Insurance Open, alongside J. B. Holmes. In the final round, he made a birdie at the 72nd hole to join a four-man sudden-death playoff with Holmes, Jason Day and Scott Stallings. At the first playoff hole, English played his lay-up into the thick rough and could only make par on the par-five 18th hole, where he was eliminated alongside Stallings.

In January 2021, English won the Sentry Tournament of Champions at Kapalua Resort in Hawaii. He won in a playoff over Joaquín Niemann. English qualified for the tournament, usually reserved for winners on Tour in the previous year, due to having qualified for the 2020 Tour Championship and the relaxation of the entry requirements due to the disruption caused by COVID-19 to the 2019–20 PGA Tour season.

In June 2021, English won the Travelers Championship with a birdie on the eighth playoff hole against Kramer Hickok. It was the second longest playoff in PGA Tour  history.

In September 2021, English played on the U.S. team in the 2021 Ryder Cup at Whistling Straits in Kohler, Wisconsin. The U.S. team won 19–9 and English went 1–2–0 including a loss in his Sunday singles match against Lee Westwood.

Amateur wins
2007 Georgia State Amateur
2011 Southern Amateur

Professional wins (8)

PGA Tour wins (4)

PGA Tour playoff record (2–1)

Nationwide Tour wins (1)

Nationwide Tour playoff record (0–1)

Other wins (3)

Results in major championships
Results not in chronological order in 2020.

CUT = missed the half-way cut
"T" = tied for place
NT = No tournament due to COVID-19 pandemic

Summary

Most consecutive cuts made – 15 (2015 Open Championship – 2022 U.S. Open)
Longest streak of top-10s – 1 (twice)

Results in The Players Championship

CUT = missed the halfway cut
"T" indicates a tie for a place
C = Canceled after the first round due to the COVID-19 pandemic

Results in World Golf Championships
Results not in chronological order before 2015.

1Cancelled due to COVID-19 pandemic

NT = No tournament
QF, R16, R32, R64 = Round in which player lost in match play
"T" = Tied

U.S. national team appearances
Amateur
Walker Cup: 2011

Professional
 Ryder Cup: 2021 (winners)

See also
2011 PGA Tour Qualifying School graduates

References

External links

American male golfers
Georgia Bulldogs men's golfers
PGA Tour golfers
Golfers from Georgia (U.S. state)
People from Valdosta, Georgia
People from Glynn County, Georgia
1989 births
Living people